Rodízio (pronounced  in Brazil) is an all-you-can-eat style of restaurant service in Brazilian restaurants.

Description

In most areas of the world outside of Brazil, a rodízio restaurant refers to a Brazilian-style steakhouse restaurant. Customers pay a fixed price (preço fixo), and waiters bring samples of food to each customer repeatedly throughout the meal, until the customers signal that they have had enough to eat.

In churrascarias or the traditional Brazilian-style steakhouse restaurants, servers come to the table with knives and a vertically-held skewer, on which are speared various kinds of premium cuts of meat, most commonly local cuts of beef, pork, chicken, lamb, and sometimes atypical or exotic meats. The exact origin of the rodízio style of service is unknown, but the traditional story is that this serving style was created when a waiter delivered a meat skewer to the wrong table by mistake but let the guest take a small piece of the meat anyway. 

Rodízio became increasingly popular in Brazil in the mid-20th century and spread around the world as experienced servers moved to open their own restaurants. In Brazil, the rodízio style is sometimes also found in Italian or more recently Japanese restaurants. Italian restaurants serving pizza are especially common.

Most rodízio courses are served right off the cooking spit and are sliced or plated right at the table. Thin slices are carved from the roasted outside layer of large cuts; the diners may use a pair of small stainless-steel tongs to grab the slices as they are cut, and then place them on their plate. Alternatively, the server will push smaller kebab-style chunks off the end of the skewer onto a serving plate.

Often, the meat servings are accompanied with fried potatoes, fried polenta, fried bananas, collard greens, black beans, rice, salads, or other side dishes (usually self-served buffet style).

In many restaurants, the diner is provided with a colored card or token. Green, on one side, indicates to servers to bring more meat. Red, on the other side, indicates that the diners have enough for the moment. This does not necessarily signal that the diner is finished eating, but only indicates that no more meat servings are desired at that moment.

Fare
The following foods are often seen at a churrascaria served rodízio style:

 Filet mignon chunks wrapped in bacon
 Turkey chunks wrapped in bacon (these two are usually two-bite sized)
 Sirloin steak (cut semicircular and served in slices)
 Roast beef (served like sirloin steak)
 Rump cover (called picanha in Portuguese)
 Flank steak (called fraldinha in Portuguese)
 Beef short ribs
 Lamb
 Pork ribs
 Chouriço or some other spicy Iberian pork sausage
 Chicken hearts
 Grilled dark-meat chicken
 Grilled pineapple or banana (meant as a palate cleanser between courses)

See also

 Brazilian cuisine
 Culinary art

References

Restaurants by type
Food and drink in Brazil